The Central Michigan Chippewas are a college football program in Division I FBS, representing Central Michigan University (CMU). CMU has the 30th highest overall winning percentage of programs playing in NCAA Division I.

The Chippewas have played in six bowl games in the last nine years, most recently defeating Washington State in the 2021 Sun Bowl. CMU drew 60,624 fans in the 2007 Motor City Bowl. CMU has played a total of eighteen post-season games (conference championships and bowl games), winning seven.

Conference affiliations
Central Michigan has been a member of the following conferences.
 Independent (1896–1949)
 Interstate Intercollegiate Athletic Conference (1950–1969)
 Independent (1970–1974)
 Mid-American Conference (1975–present)

Championships

National championships
The Chippewas won the 1974 NCAA Division II National Championship.

Conference championships
Central Michigan has won 16 conference championships including seven Mid-American Conference Championships.

† Co-champions

Division championships
Central Michigan has won 5 division championships:

† Co-champions

Head coaches
Many notable coaches have contributed to CMU's culture. Some include legendary "Wild" Bill Kelly who won seven conference championships in sixteen years and whom Kelly/Shorts Stadium is named after; national championship winning coach Roy Kramer who had a 72% winning percentage and never had a losing season in more than a decade; College Football Hall of Fame coach Herb Deromedi who is the winningest coach in MAC history and Brian Kelly and Butch Jones who combined for three MAC Championships in four years, four consecutive bowl appearance and top 25 finish in the nation.

CMU head coaches through the 2022 season.

† Interim

Bowl games
Central Michigan holds a 4–9 record in bowl games.

Playoff appearances

NCAA Division II playoffs
The Chippewas made one appearance in the Division II playoffs, with a combined record of 3-0.

Rivalries

Western Michigan

These archrivals first met in 1907 and have faced one another annually since 1943. Since the two schools are separated by a two-hour drive, the visiting team typically has a strong fan and student presence at the game. The winner of the game receives the Cannon Trophy. The outcome also helps determine the winner of the Michigan MAC Trophy, a trophy fought over between Michigan's three MAC football teams: the Chippewas, the Broncos, and the Eastern Michigan Eagles. WMU leads the series overall 51–39–2.

Eastern Michigan

The Chippewas and Eagles maintain a less prominent, but steady rivalry. CMU holds the series lead over EMU, leading 62–30–6.

Traditions

Kelly/Shorts game day experience
Central Michigan has the largest on-campus stadium in the Mid-American Conference, seating 32,885 fans and has been playing home football games dating back to 1896. The Sporting News has named Kelly/Shorts Stadium "the finest football facility in the Mid-American Conference" and "the best game day atmosphere in the MAC".

The East End of the stadium (as of 2014) once again hosts the CMU Student section backing the football team. The Chippewa Marching Band, cheerleaders, and dance team add to the game day experience and has helped CMU become one of the nation's winningest schools at home with a .714 winning percentage all-time at Kelly/Shorts Stadium.

CMU drew a capacity crowd of 35,127 fans for the Central Michigan–Michigan State game televised on ESPNU and has hosted schools from the ACC, Big Ten, and Big 12 conferences. Future opponents at home include schools from the Big Ten, ACC, Big 12, Pac-12 and Mountain West conferences.

In 2010, the CMU Board of Trustees designed and set course to construct a state of the art stadium expansion to integrate a hotel, restaurant, and conference center connected by a glass atrium to new stadium suites on the east side. This addition will be custom-built into Kelly/Shorts Stadium.

Newer upgrades include a video scoreboard standing six stories and featuring two video replay boards—one facing into the stadium and a second board facing outside the stadium by tailgating areas. NFL-quality permanent lighting has been installed for television and future ESPN night games.

College Football Hall of Fame

One former Central Michigan coach has been inducted into the College Football Hall of Fame.

Notable players

 Curtis Adams (1984) – AP All-American, San Diego Chargers running back, NFL draft choice
 Jahleel Addae (2012) - Los Angeles Chargers Safety
 Vince Agnew – NFL and CFL player
 Ron Bartell (2004) – cornerback, 2nd round NFL draft choice, nine-year NFL veteran finishing career with the Detroit Lions
 Dan Bazuin (2006) – All-American, Chicago Bears defensive end, 2007 NFL 2nd round draft choice
 Walter Beach (1959) – AP All-American, Cleveland Browns safety, NFL draft choice of the New York Giants
 Nick Bellore (2010) - Seattle Seahawks fullback/linebacker
 Ray Bentley (1985) – Buffalo Bills linebacker, started two Super Bowl games, recent sports radio personality, ABC College Football and NFL on Fox broadcaster
 Novo Bojovic (1984) – St. Louis Cardinals kicker
 John Bonamego (1986) – Los Angeles Rams special teams coordinator and coordinator for five different NFL teams
 Jim Bowman (1984) – AP All-American, New England Patriots free safety, played in Super Bowl, NFL 2nd round draft choice
 Antonio Brown (2009) – 6× Pro Bowl (2011, 2013–2017), 2× First-team All-American (2008, 2009), 2× First-team All-MAC (2008, 2009)
 Titus Davis (2014) – Wide Receiver
 Tony Elliott (1984) – Green Bay Packers nickel back and safety
 Eric Fisher (2012) – Kansas City Chiefs offensive tackle - 1st overall pick of the 2013 NFL Draft, First-team All-American, First-team All-MAC
 Kavon Frazier (2016) - Dallas Cowboys Safety - drafted in the 6th round
 Eric Ghiaciuc (2004) – Cincinnati Bengals center, 2005 NFL 4th round draft choice
 Josh Gordy (2009) – Defensive Back - played for several NFL teams, Super Bowl XLV champion
 Brock Gutierrez (1996) – ten-year NFL veteran at center finishing career with the Detroit Lions
 Brett Hartmann (2010) – Houston Texans punter. Suffered a career-ending injury
 Gary Hogeboom (1979) – NFL quarterback 11 seasons, primarily a backup with the Dallas Cowboys and the Indianapolis Colts; NFL 5th round draft choice; Notable Survivor reality T.V. contestant. 
 Tory Humphrey (2004) – New Orleans Saints, Super Bowl champion, tight end.
 Robert Jackson (1981) – Cincinnati Bengals safety, eight seasons and NFL draft choice
 Sean Murphy-Bunting (2018) - Cornerback, First-team All-MAC (2018), 2019 2nd round draft pick (pick 39 overall) for the Tampa Bay Buccaneers, Super Bowl LV champion
 Jake Olson (2013) – offensive tackle - played 3 CFL seasons
 Jim Podoley (1956) – AP All-American, Washington Redskins running back, Pro Bowl player, NFL 4th round draft choice
 Thomas Rawls (2015) - Running Back, formerly of New York Jets & Seattle Seahawks
 Scott Rehberg (1996) – New England Patriots offensive lineman and NFL 7th round draft choice
 Cooper Rush (2017) - Dallas Cowboys Quarterback
 Joe Staley (2006) – San Francisco 49ers offensive tackle - 28th pick of the 2007 NFL Draft, 6× Pro Bowl (2011–2015,2017)
 L.T. Walton (2015) - Pittsburgh Steelers Defensive End - drafted in the 6th round
 Frank Zombo (2009) - Kansas City Chiefs Linebacker - Super Bowl XLV Starter and Champion, 2x First-team ALL-MAC (2008, 2009)
Cullen Jenkins (2003) - Green Bay Packers, NY Giants, Washington Redskins and Philadelphia Eagles defensive lineman - Super Bowl XLV Champion

Media

Radio
The CMU Sports Network broadcasts all games live throughout Michigan and online for free.

CMU Sports Network Affiliates:
 1270 AM WXYT, Detroit
 1340 AM WJRW, Grand Rapids
 98.5 FM WUPS, Houghton Lake
 730 AM WVFN, Lansing
 95.3 FM WCFX, Mount Pleasant
 97.5 FM WLAW-FM, Muskegon
 1110 AM WJML, Petoskey

Television
The ESPN family of channels and Fox Sports affiliates have provided national and local television coverage.

CMU Sports Zone provides live and archive Internet video-feed of games, gameday coverage, and coaches shows.

Future non-conference opponents 
Announced schedules as of January 9, 2021.

References

External links

 

 
American football teams established in 1896
1896 establishments in Michigan